Fuglenes Lighthouse was a coastal lighthouse located in the municipality of Hammerfest in Troms og Finnmark, Norway. It was established in 1859, and deactivated in 1911, when it was replaced by a light.

See also

 List of lighthouses in Norway
 Lighthouses in Norway

References

External links
 Norsk Fyrhistorisk Forening 

Lighthouses completed in 1859
Lighthouses in Troms og Finnmark
Hammerfest